McCorkell is a surname. Notable people with the surname include:

David McCorkell (born 1955), Lord Lieutenant of County Antrim (from 2019)
Sir Dudley McCorkell (1883–1960), Mayor of Londonderry (1930–1933), and ex officio member of the Senate of Northern Ireland and former Lord Lieutenant of County Londonderry
Gordon McCorkell (born 1983), Scottish actor
Jenna McCorkell (born 1986)) is a British figure skater from Coleraine
Jock McCorkell (born 1918), former Australian rules footballer in the Victorian Football League
Lady McCorkell, founder of the Derry Branch of the Red Cross
Colonel Sir Michael McCorkell (1925–2006), former Lord Lieutenant of County Londonderry, Northern Irish soldier and public servant
Neil McCorkell, wicketkeeper for Hampshire County Cricket Club
Ross McCorkell, Scottish-American drag queen

See also
McCorkell Line, operated by Wm. McCorkell & Co. Ltd. from 1778, carrying passengers from Ireland, Scotland and England to the Americas